The following NASCAR national series were held in 1997:

1997 NASCAR Winston Cup Series - The top racing series in NASCAR.
1997 NASCAR Busch Series - The second-highest racing series in NASCAR.
1997 NASCAR Craftsman Truck Series - The third-highest racing series in NASCAR.

 
NASCAR seasons